Urduliz Fútbol Taldea is a Spanish football club based in Urduliz, in the autonomous community of Basque Country. Founded in 1996, it plays in Tercera División RFEF – Group 4, holding home games at Estadio Iparralde, with a capacity of 2,000 people.

History
Founded in 1996, Urduliz played in the seventh and sixth tiers until 2014, when the club won the Preferente and achieved promotion to the División de Honor. On 27 May 2019, the club achieved promotion to Tercera División for the first time ever.

In the 2020–21 season, the club reached the play-offs, but missed out promotion in the Final against Sestao River.

Season to season

2 seasons in Tercera División
1 season in Tercera División RFEF

References

External links
Soccerway team profile

Football clubs in the Basque Country (autonomous community)
Association football clubs established in 1996
1996 establishments in Spain